Krasnohvardiiske or Krasnogvardeyskoye (until 1945, Qurman) is an urban-type settlement in the Autonomous Republic of Crimea, a territory recognized by a majority of countries as part of Ukraine and annexed by Russia. The town also serves as the administrative center of the Krasnohvardiiske Raion (district), housing the district's local administration buildings. Population: 

As of the 2001 Ukrainian Census, its population was 11,168.

See also
 Oktiabrske, the other urban-type settlement in Krasnohvardiiske Raion of Crimea

References

Urban-type settlements in Crimea
Krasnohvardiiske Raion